Edward Stanley,  (1 January 1779 – 6 September 1849) was an English clergyman who served as Bishop of Norwich between 1837 and 1849. He set about combating laxity and want of discipline among the clergy.

Early life
Born in London into a notable Cheshire family, Stanley was the second son of Sir John Thomas Stanley FRSE, 6th Baronet of Alderley, and the younger brother of John Stanley, 1st Baron Stanley of Alderley.

Educated at St John's College, Cambridge (16th wrangler, 1802), he was ordained in 1802 and three years later became rector of Alderley, Cheshire, a position he held for the next 32 years. While there he took a great interest in education, and encouraged especially the teaching of secular subjects at his school.

Episcopal discipline
In 1837 he was consecrated Bishop of Norwich and appointed Clerk of the Closet, holding both positions until his death. The diocese at this time was conspicuous for laxity and want of discipline, which he proceeded to remedy, although at first he met with much opposition. Ordinations and confirmations were held more regularly and frequently, schools were properly inspected, the Plurality Act, which prohibited the holding of more than one benefice by a clergyman except in certain cases, was enforced, and undesirable clergy were removed.

Stanley showed tolerance towards Dissenters and supported all missionary undertakings, without regard for their sectarian associations. In politics he was a Liberal and devoted himself especially to educational questions.

Other work
Stanley's letters, Before and after Waterloo (edited by J. H. Adeane and M. Grenfell, 1907), are of interest to students of Napoleonic history.

Bishop Stanley was the original Patron of the Ipswich Museum and presided at its opening in 1847. A portrait of him in oils is displayed there. From 1837 to 1849 he was President of the Linnean Society.

Death and succession
Edward Stanley died in 1849 and was buried in the nave of Norwich cathedral. He had married Catherine, eldest daughter of Oswald Leycester (another notable Cheshire family) in 1810. They had five children, including Owen Stanley, Arthur Penrhyn Stanley and Mary Stanley.

He was succeeded by Samuel Hinds, a broad-churchman with strong associations with the Maoris of New Zealand, notably the Ngati Kuri and Te Patu tribes.

Cultural reference
Stanley appears as a character in Alan Garner's novel Strandloper.

References

External links

1779 births
1849 deaths
Anglican clergy from London
Alumni of St John's College, Cambridge
Bishops of Norwich
19th-century Church of England bishops
Clerks of the Closet
Younger sons of baronets
Edward
Presidents of the Linnean Society of London
Fellows of the Royal Society